Erik Wilhelm "Loppan" Adlerz (23 July 1892 – 8 September 1975) was a Swedish diver who competed at the 1908, 1912, 1920 and 1924 Summer Olympics.

In 1908 he was eliminated in the first round in the 10 metre platform event. Four years later he won gold medals in the 10 m platform and plain high diving. In 1920 he won the silver medal in the 10 m platform; in the plain high diving event he finished fourth next to three Swedish teammates. In 1924 he finished fourth in the 10 m platform and failed to reach the final in the plain high diving.

He was the elder brother of Märta Adlerz, who competed in swimming at the 1912 Olympics. In 1986 he was inducted to the International Swimming Hall of Fame.

See also
 List of members of the International Swimming Hall of Fame

References

External links

 
 
 

1892 births
1975 deaths
Divers from Stockholm
Swedish male divers
Olympic divers of Sweden
Divers at the 1908 Summer Olympics
Divers at the 1912 Summer Olympics
Divers at the 1920 Summer Olympics
Divers at the 1924 Summer Olympics
Olympic gold medalists for Sweden
Olympic silver medalists for Sweden
Olympic medalists in diving
Medalists at the 1920 Summer Olympics
Medalists at the 1912 Summer Olympics
Stockholms KK divers
20th-century Swedish people